São Silvestre (also known as São Silvestre do Campo) is a civil parish in the municipality of Coimbra, Portugal. The population in 2011 was 3,122, in an area of 10.27 km2.

References 

Freguesias of Coimbra